The name Page has been used to name two Tropical cyclones in the Western Pacific Ocean.

 Typhoon Page (1990) – Category 5 equivalent typhoon, became the fourth typhoon to strike Japan within three months
 Typhoon Page (1994) – Category 2 equivalent typhoon that stayed out to sea, but generated large waves and high tides in the western Mariana Islands

Pacific typhoon set index articles